Alphonse Alfred Clément Larivière (July 24, 1842 – September 20, 1925) was a Canadian politician and journalist.

Biography 
Born in Montreal, Canada East, the son of Abraham C. Larivière and Adelaide Marcil, he was educated at the Collège Saint-Marie and the Montreal School of Military Instruction there. In 1867, he married Marie Melvina Bourdeau. Larivière served in the militia in both Quebec and Manitoba. He was president of the Quebec Board of Arts and Manufactures. Larivière served in the Dominion Lands Office at Winnipeg from 1871 to 1875. He was a special correspondent for La Minerve in Montreal and later became chief editor for Le Manitoba. In 1874, he was named a justice of the peace for Selkirk County.

Larivière ran unsuccessfully for a seat in the Manitoba assembly in 1874. He was a member of the Legislative Assembly of Manitoba from 1878 to 1888 and served as Provincial Secretary, Minister of Agriculture, Provincial Treasurer, and Provincial Lands Commissioner. In an 1889 by-election held after Joseph Royal was named lieutenant-governor for the Northwest Territories, he was elected to the House of Commons of Canada for the electoral district of Provencher. A Conservative, he was re-elected in 1891, 1896, and 1900. He was defeated in 1904 and 1908. In 1911, he was summoned to the Senate of Canada representing the senatorial division of Provencher, Manitoba on the advice of Robert Borden. He served until 1917.

He also served as president of the Selkirk County Agricultural Society and superintendent of Catholic schools. Larivière was a director of the Commercial Bank of Manitoba and the Red River Bridge Company. He was founder and first president for the Association Jean-Baptiste du Manitoba. He founded La Société de Colonisation du Manitoba in 1874 and was its first president. He also served on the council for the University of Manitoba.

Larivière died in St. Boniface at the age of 83.

Electoral history

References
 

1842 births
1925 deaths
Canadian senators from Manitoba
Conservative Party of Canada (1867–1942) MPs
Conservative Party of Canada (1867–1942) senators
Members of the House of Commons of Canada from Manitoba
Progressive Conservative Party of Manitoba MLAs
Finance ministers of Manitoba
Canadian justices of the peace